Mehraban-e Sofla Rural District is a rural district (dehestan) in Gol Tappeh District, Kabudarahang County, Hamadan Province, Iran. At the 2006 census, its population was 9,158, in 2,015 families. The rural district has 21 villages.

References 

Rural Districts of Hamadan Province
Kabudarahang County